Jean-Philibert Damiron (10 January 1794 – 11 January 1862) was a French philosopher.

Biography
Damiron was born at Belleville. At nineteen he entered the École Normale, where he studied under Eugène Burnouf, Abel-Francois Villemain, and Victor Cousin. After teaching for several years in provincial towns, he came to Paris, where he lectured on philosophy in various institutions, and finally became professor in the normal school, and titular professor at the Sorbonne. In 1824 he joined Paul-François Dubois and Théodore Simon Jouffroy in establishing Le Globe; and he was also a member of the committee of the society which took for its motto Aide-toi, le ciel t'aidera. In 1833 he was appointed chevalier of the Legion of Honour, and in 1836 member of the Academy of Moral Sciences. Damiron died in Paris.

Works
Damiron works are known for his accounts of French philosophers:
 Nouveaux mélanges philosophiques de Jouffroy (1842), one edition contained a notice of the author, in which Damiron softened and omitted several expressions used by Jouffroy, which were opposed to the system of education adopted by the Sorbonne.
 De la mutilation des manuscrits de M. Jouffroy (1843), an article which gave rise to a bitter controversy, and to a book by Pierre Leroux, .
 Essai sur l'histoire de la philosophie en France au XIXe siècle (1828, 3rd ed. 1834)
 Essai sur l'histoire de la philosophie en France au XVIIe siècle (1846)
 Mémoires a servir pour l'histoire de la philosophie en France au XVIIIe siècle (1858-1864)
 Cours de la philosophie
 De la Providence (1849, 1850)

References

 

1794 births
1862 deaths
French philosophers
Academic staff of the University of Paris
French male non-fiction writers